Eleazar Eskin is a computer scientist and geneticist, professor and Chair of the Department of Computational Medicine, and professor of computer science and human genetics at the University of California, Los Angeles. His research focuses on bioinformatics, genomics, and machine learning. A primary research focus is on developing statistical and computational techniques to probe the genetic basis of human disease.

Awards and honours
He was elected a Fellow of the International Society for Computational Biology (ISCB) in 2019 for "outstanding contributions to the fields of computational biology and bioinformatics".

Selected research
Kang, Hyun Min, et al. "Variance component model to account for sample structure in genome-wide association studies." Nature genetics 42.4 (2010): 348.
Kang, Hyun Min, et al. "Efficient control of population structure in model organism association mapping." Genetics 178.3 (2008): 1709–1723.
Tompa, Martin, et al. "Assessing computational tools for the discovery of transcription factor binding sites." Nature biotechnology 23.1 (2005): 137.
Leslie, Christina, Eleazar Eskin, and William Stafford Noble. "The spectrum kernel: A string kernel for SVM protein classification." Biocomputing 2002. 2001. 564–575.

References

UCLA Henry Samueli School of Engineering and Applied Science faculty
Living people
Year of birth missing (living people)
Place of birth missing (living people)
American bioinformaticians
American geneticists